Jumpman is a 2018 drama film directed and written by Ivan I. Tverdovskiy. The film received mixed reviews from critics.

Plot 
The film tells about a young man named Denis, who was left as a child by his parents, but this did not prevent him from becoming a strong person. One day he meets his mother, along with whom he goes to corrupt Moscow, where he is drawn into a risky adventure.

Cast
 Denis Vlasenko as Denis
 Anna Slyu		as Oksana, Denis's mother
 Pavel Chinaryov		as prosecutor
 Vilma Kutaviciute		as lawyer
 Daniil Steklov as traffic policeman

Reception

Critical response

References

External links 
 
Anton Dolin. «Подбросы» Ивана Твердовского. Фильм-метафора о современной России — явный претендент на призы «Кинотавра» 
2018 films
2010s Russian-language films
Russian crime drama films
2018 crime drama films